Forest Hill is a suburb of Fort Worth in Tarrant County, Texas, United States. The population was 12,355 at the 2010 census.

History
Forest Hill began around 1860. The community was called Brambleton Station and Forest Hill Village before being named Forest Hill. By 1896 the community had its first schools and was established as a suburb of Fort Worth. In 1905 Old Mansfield Road and Forest Hill Drive were the city's two main roads. In 1912 citizens drilled a "crooked hole well," the first private water system in the community. By 1925 the community had 25 residents and two businesses. Forest Hill gained a new source of water in the early 1940s. By 1944 Trentman Company and the Johnson Campbell Company began building homes. The owners of the private water system sold it to Texas Water Company.

The community incorporated as a village on March 16, 1946. In the late 1940s the village had around 90 people. In 1949 the village petitioned to be relabeled as a city after reaching 500 citizens; on April 8 of that year the village was relabeled as a city. By 1954 the volunteer fire department, the court, and the corporation court opened. The city had 1,519 people in the mid-1950s.

The city expanded in the 1960s. In 1967 the city had 3,800 people; the city grew due to its proximity to Fort Worth. By the early 1970s the city adopted the Forest Hill Home Rule Charter in order to more easily annex territory and to allow for better governance. The city had 10,250 people in 1976 and 11,482 in 1990. In the 1970s, it elected its first female mayor, Jackie Larson.

Geography

Forest Hill is located at  (32.663383, –97.268292).

According to the United States Census Bureau, the city has a total area of 4.2 square miles (11.0 km2), all land.

Demographics

2020 census

As of the 2020 United States census, there were 13,955 people, 3,754 households, and 2,944 families residing in the city.

2000 census
As of the census of 2000, there were 12,949 people, 3,699 households, and 2,944 families residing in the city. The population density was 3,049.7 people per square mile (1,176.4/km2). There were 3,876 housing units at an average density of 912.9/sq mi (352.1/km2). The racial makeup of the city was 3.0% White, 75.0% African American, 0.42% Native American, 1.14% Asian, 0.01% Pacific Islander, 6.33% from other races, and 1.42% from two or more races. Hispanic or Latino of any race were 18.14% of the population.

There were 3,699 households, out of which 36.8% had children under the age of 18 living with them, 53.2% were married couples living together, 20.8% had a female householder with no husband present, and 20.4% were non-families. 17.1% of all households were made up of individuals, and 5.7% had someone living alone who was 65 years of age or older. The average household size was 3.04 and the average family size was 3.42.

In the city, the population was spread out, with 26.3% under the age of 18, 9.1% from 18 to 24, 31.0% from 25 to 44, 24.5% from 45 to 64, and 9.1% who were 65 years of age or older. The median age was 35 years. For every 100 females, there were 114.7 males. For every 100 females age 18 and over, there were 119.7 males.

The median income for a household in the city was $37,473, and the median income for a family was $40,357. Males had a median income of $29,097 versus $25,527 for females. The per capita income for the city was $17,027. About 11.3% of families and 16.0% of the population were below the poverty line, including 25.2% of those under age 18 and 11.5% of those age 65 or over.

Transportation
By 1911 the city became a stop on the Fort Worth Southern Traction Company's electric urban railway from Fort Worth to Cleburne. The streetcar line operated on an hourly basis in the 1900s.

Education 
Forest Hill is partly in the Everman Independent School District and partly in the Fort Worth Independent School District.

Two primary schools, Harlean Beal Elementary School and David K. Sellars Elementary School, serve separate areas within the FWISD section of Forest Hill. The FWISD secondary schools that serve the section of Forest Hill, located in Fort Worth, include Glencrest 6th Grade School, Forest Oak Middle School, and O. D. Wyatt High School.

In 1896 Forest Hill schools had three teachers, 91 white students, and 15 black students. By 1905 Forest Hill, now having no schools for black students, had two schools, four teachers, and 226 students.

Students living in the Everman Independent School District portion of the city attend Roger E. Souder Elementary School, Dan Powell Intermediate School, Everman Junior High School and Everman High School.

References

External links
 City of Forest Hill official website
 

Dallas–Fort Worth metroplex
Cities in Texas
Cities in Tarrant County, Texas
Populated places established in 1860